is a male Japanese Taekwondo practitioner. He won the bronze medal in the men's bantamweight division (-62 kg) at the 2001 World Taekwondo Championships held in Jeju City, South Korea. Higuchi competed at the 2000 Summer Olympics.

External links
 The-Sports.org
 Taekwondo Data

1981 births
Living people
People from Kumamoto Prefecture
Sportspeople from Kumamoto Prefecture
Japanese male taekwondo practitioners
Olympic taekwondo practitioners of Japan
Taekwondo practitioners at the 2000 Summer Olympics
World Taekwondo Championships medalists
Asian Taekwondo Championships medalists
21st-century Japanese people